Greasy Grapes is a rock & roll band formed in 2006 by Antonio Romero (guitar), Leo Laya (vocals), Alberto Márquez (bass) and Rafael Márquez (drums) in Caracas and mostly influenced by Southern Rock bands from the Deep South of the US. They have been labeled by Al Borde, a leading cutting edge Latin Alternative media company in United States as "Southern Rock bastard seeds planted at Caribbean shores".

History
Their work is deeply influenced by American traditional music and through the years they have archived the respect of legendary southern rock musicians like Henry Paul (The Outlaws) and Barry Dunaway (Pat Travers, Yngwie Malmsteen, Foghat). After years of touring in their native Venezuela they received an invitation to participate at the CBGB Fest 2013 in New York City as the only southern rock band in the festival lineup in spite of not being Americans and where they shared the stage with renowned artist like Ginger Baker (Cream), Lisa Loeb, Jakob Dylan, My Morning Jacket among many others, which finally resulted in its relocation to the US.

Greasy Grapes has released three albums in a totally independent fashion Lengua Madre EP (2013), Headed South (2012) and At the Back of the Hill (2009). All three album are deeply rooted in a vintage vibe and an eclectic blend of rock, soul, blues and country sounds. The first two albums were recorded by Francisco Domingo at True Digital Studios and Taller de Arte Sonoro. They have worked with Grammy Awarded and Grammy nominee artists like Bob Katz, Erik Aldrey and Mauricio Arcas a.k.a. Maurimix from Los Amigos Invisibles.

Since the release of their debut album "At the Back of the Hill" in 2009 Greasy Grapes has captivated the attention of fans as genuine performers of the Southern Rock genre not only in their native Venezuela but in places like United States, Japan, Italy, and Germany.

Members
Antonio Romero (guitar)
Leo Laya (vocals)
Alberto Márquez (bass)
Rafael Márquez (drums)

Former members
José Miguel Bermudez (lead vocalist)
Luifer Guirados (guitar)
Jesús Dávila (drums)

Discography

Lengua Madre (2013)
1. Ya no
2. Qué forma de vivir ft. Mattia Medina
3. Nuestra canción
4. Sopla el viento ft. Luis Irán
5. Ojos de miel
6. Por ti

Singles
Qué forma de vivir
Ya no

Headed south (2012)
1. Northern light
2. Keep rising
3. She fades away
4. Kiss me one more time
5. Absolute love
6. Midnight train
7. Drawing a smile
8. Oldman
9. Ophelia
10. Every one of you
11. She's a snake

Singles
Drawing a smile
Northern light

At the back of the hill (2009)
1. Seven silver stars
2. Southern wind
3. Boston winter
4. Candles in the rain
5. Take me to the sky
 6. Don't you hide
7. Falling flames
8. It's gonna be alright
9. A bend on the road
10. We should leave this town
11. Blue dreams

Singles
Seven silver stars
Candles in the rain

References

External links

Southern rock musical groups
Venezuelan rock music groups
Musical groups established in 2006
2006 establishments in Venezuela